Amrik Singh Dhillon, is a Punjabi, Indian politician and former Member of the Punjab Legislative Assembly for the constituency of Samrala, District Ludhiana. He has contested elections from Samrala five times and won four times. (1997, 2002, 2012 and 2017). He was a member of the Indian National Congress. He is loved by the people of Samrala and from Mr. Padam Jain. 

He also sits on and is a member of the following Punjab Government Committees:

Committee on Public Accounts
Committee on Government Assurances
In February 2022 he was ruled out of the party when INC announced Rupinder Singh Raja Gill as MLA face for 2022 elections, he decided to fight in elections as an independent.

When he failed to get seat, he joined Bharatiya￼ Janata Party (BJP)

External links
Official Punjab Government personal contact website

Legislative Assembly.

Indian Sikhs
Punjabi people
Punjab, India MLAs 2012–2017
Living people
Politicians from Ludhiana
Year of birth missing (living people)
Punjab, India MLAs 2017–2022
Indian National Congress politicians from Punjab, India